Jamey Chadwell (born January 10, 1977) is an American college football coach and former player. He is the head football coach at Liberty University, a position he has held since the 2023 season. Chadwell served as the head football coach at  North Greenville University from 2009 to 2011, Delta State University in 2012, Charleston Southern University from 2013 and 2016, and Coastal Carolina University, first in an interim capacity in 2017 and then on a permanent basis from 2019 to 2022.

Chadwell grew up in Tennessee and attended East Tennessee State University, where he played quarterback from 1995 to 1999. He began his coaching career in 2000 at East Tennessee State before taking an assistant position at Charleston Southern in 2004. He won several coach of the year awards in 2020 after leading his Coastal Carolina team to an 11–1 record.

Coaching career
After his playing career ended, Chadwell began his coaching career at his alma mater East Tennessee State in 2000. He remained as an offensive assistant with the Buccaneers through the 2003 season when he left to take a position at Charleston Southern.

Head coaching career
After serving as an assistant offensive coach with the Charleston Southern Buccaneers, on February 6, 2009, Chadwell was hired as the head coach at North Greenville University. During his three-year tenure with the Crusaders, Chadwell had an overall record of 20 wins and 14 losses (20–14). He also led the Crusaders to their first all-time appearance in the NCAA Division II football playoffs following the 2011 season. In the playoffs, Chadwell led the Crusaders to the quarterfinals where they lost to Delta State 28–23.

On January 2, 2012, Chadwell was hired by Delta State to succeed Ron Roberts as the head coach of the Statesmen. Chadwell resigned as head coach of the Statesmen after only one season on January 17, 2013, to take the same position with Charleston Southern. During his one season at Delta State, he compiled an overall record of 3 wins and 7 losses.

On January 17, 2013, Chadwell was formally introduced as the third-ever head coach at Charleston Southern.

On January 8, 2017, Chadwell was named the new offensive coordinator at Coastal Carolina.

On July 28, 2017, Chadwell was named interim head coach for Coastal Carolina as head coach Joe Moglia took a medical leave of absence. The school announced on January 5, 2018, that Moglia had been medically cleared to return to full-time coaching and would reassume the head coaching position.

In 2018, the NCAA released a detailed report concerning numerous NCAA violations across the Charleston Southern athletics department that occurred during Chadwell's tenure as head football coach. The athletics department was found to have incorrectly certified 55 student athletes across 12 sports over a six-year period, and football players were found to have used scholarship funds to purchase electronics and jewelry from the campus book store. Ultimately, the NCAA sanctions included vacating 18 wins from the 2014 and 2015 football seasons and the 2015 Big South Championship, in addition to several vacated wins in other sports.  Also vacated were three wins over crosstown rival The Citadel, games during which CSU used ineligible players.

Coastal Carolina 
On January 18, 2019, Chadwell was formally introduced as the third all-time head coach at Coastal Carolina.

Following the 2020 regular season, Chadwell was named the winner of the 2020 AP College Coach of the Year Award; the first time a coach from the Sun Belt Conference has won the award, and just the third coach from outside the Power Five conferences to do so.

On February 14, 2021, it was revealed that Chadwell more than doubled his salary with a new agreement he signed in December 2020. His base salary was $850,000 for the 2021 season and included a $50,000 pay increase every year until the contract was scheduled to end on December 31, 2027. Chadwell's increased pay made him the second highest paid coach in the Sun Belt Conference. Had Chadwell remained with CCU, his 2027 salary would have been $1,150,000, not including any bonuses.

Liberty 
On December 4, 2022, he was introduced as the tenth head coach in Liberty history.

Personal life
Chadwell is married to the former Solmaz Zarrineh. The couple has a son named Jameson and two daughters, Avery and Soraya.

Head coaching record

References

External links
 Liberty profile
 Coastal Carolina profile

1977 births
Living people
American football quarterbacks
Charleston Southern Buccaneers football coaches
Coastal Carolina Chanticleers football coaches
Delta State Statesmen football coaches
East Tennessee State Buccaneers football coaches
East Tennessee State Buccaneers football players
Liberty Flames football coaches
North Greenville Crusaders football coaches
People from Campbell County, Tennessee
Coaches of American football from Tennessee
Players of American football from Tennessee